The Karlsruhe Congress was an international meeting of chemists held in Karlsruhe, Germany from 3 to 5 September 1860. It was the first international conference of chemistry worldwide.

The meeting 

The Karlsruhe Congress was called so that European chemists could discuss matters of chemical nomenclature, notation, and atomic weights. The organization, invitation, and sponsorship of the conference were handled by August Kekulé, Adolphe Wurtz, and Karl Weltzien. As an example of the problems facing the delegates, Kekulé's Lehrbuch der Organischen Chemie gave nineteen different formulas used by chemists for acetic acid, as shown in the figure on this page.

An understanding was reached on the time and place of the meeting, and printing of a circular addressed to European chemists listed below, which explained the objectives and goals of an international congress was agreed upon. The circular concluded: "...with the aim of avoiding any unfortunate omissions, the undersigned request that the individuals to whom this circular will be sent please communicate it to their scientist friends who are duly authorized to attend the planned conference."

The circular was sent to:

 Austria
Innsbruck: Heinrich Hlasiwetz.
Vienna: Anton Schrötter von Kristelli; Leopold von Pebal.
 Belgium
Brussels: Jean Servais Stas.
Ghent: Friedrich August Kekule von Stradonitz.
 France
Paris: Anselme Payen; Antoine Bussy; Antoine Jérôme Balard; Auguste André Thomas Cahours; Charles Adolphe Wurtz; Edmond Frémy; Eugéne-Melchior Péligot; Henri Étienne Sainte-Claire Deville; Henri Victor Regnault; Jean-Baptiste Boussingault; Jean-Baptiste Dumas; Louis Pasteur; Théophile-Jules Pelouze.
Rennes: Faustino Malaguti.
 Germany
Berlin: Eilhard Mitscherlich.
Freiburg im Breisgau: Lambert Henrich von Babo.
Geissen: Heinrich Will; Hermann Franz Moritz Kopp.
Göttingen: Friedrich Wöhler.
Heidelberg: Robert Bunsen.
Karlsruhe: Karl Weltzien.
Leipzig: Otto Linné Erdmann.
Munich: Justus von Liebig.
Stuttgart: Hermann von Fehling.
Tübingen: Adolph Strecker.
 Italy
Genova: Stanislao Cannizzaro.
Turim: Raffaele Piria.
 Russia
Kasan: Nikolay Nikolayevich Beketov.
St. Petersburg: Alexander Nikolayevich Engelhardt; Carl Julius Fritzsche; Nikolai Nikolaevich Sokolov; Nikolay Nikolaevich Zinin.
 Switzerland
Zurich: Georg Andreas Karl Staedeler.
Geneva: Jean Charles Galissard de Marignac.
 United Kingdom
London: Alexander William Williamson; August Wilhelm von Hofmann; Sir Edward Frankland; William Odling.
Manchester: Henry Enfield Roscoe.
Oxford: Sir Benjamin Collins Brodie, 2nd Baronet.

The Karlsruhe meeting ended with no firm agreement on the vexing problem of atomic and molecular weights. However, on the meeting's last day reprints of Stanislao Cannizzaro's 1858 paper on atomic weights, in which he utilized earlier work by Amedeo Avogadro, were distributed. Cannizzaro's efforts exerted a heavy and, in some cases, an almost immediate influence on the delegates. Lothar Meyer later wrote that on reading Cannizzaro's paper, "The scales seemed to fall from my eyes."

An important long-term result of the Karlsruhe Congress was the adoption of the now-familiar atomic weights. Prior to the Karlsruhe meeting, and going back to Dalton's work in 1803, several systems of atomic weights were in use. In one case, a value of 1 was adopted as the weight of hydrogen (the base unit), with 6 for carbon and 8 for oxygen. As long as there were uncertainties over atomic weights then the compositions of many compounds remained in doubt. Following the Karlsruhe meeting, values of about 1 for hydrogen, 12 for carbon, 16 for oxygen, and so forth were adopted. This was based on a recognition that certain elements, such as hydrogen, nitrogen, and oxygen, were composed of diatomic molecules and not individual atoms.

Ihde has argued that the Karlsruhe meeting was the first international meeting of chemists and that it led to the eventual founding of the International Union of Pure and Applied Chemistry (IUPAC).

Attendance 

The number of people who wanted to participate was considerable, and on 3 September 1860, 140 chemists met together in the meeting room of the second Chamber of State, which was made available by the Frederick I, Grand Duke of Baden.

According to Wurtz, the printed list of members, supplemented by handwritten additions, contains 126 names listed below.

 Belgium:
Brussels: J. Stas;
Ghent: Donny, A. Kekulé
 Germany:
Berlin: Ad. Baeyer, G. Quinke;
Bonn: H. Landolt; 
Breslau: Lothar Meyer; 
Kassel: Guckelberger,; 
Klausthal: Streng;
Darmstadt: E. Winkler;
Erlangen: v. Gorup-Besanez; 
Freiburg i. B.: v. Babo, Schneyder (Woldemar Alexander Adolph von Schneider, 1843–1914);
Giessen: Boeckmann (Emil Boeckmann), H. Kopp, H. Will;
Göttingen: F. Beilstein; 
Halle a. S.: W. Heintz; 
Hanover: Heeren; 
Heidelberg: Becker, O. Braun, R. Bunsen, L. Carius, E. Erlenmeyer, O. Mendius, Schiel (Jacob Heinrich Wilhelm Schiel, 1813-1889);
Jena: Lehmann, H. Ludwig;
Karlsruhe: A. Klemm, R. Muller, J. Nessler, Petersen, K. Seubert (Karl Seubert, 1815–1868), Weltzien;
Leipzig: O. L. Erdmann, Hirzel, Knop, Kuhn;
Mannheim: Gundelach (Carl Gundelach), Schroeder;
Marburg a. L.: R. Schmidt, Zwenger;
Munich: Geiger (Friedrich Geiger, 1833-1889);
Nuremberg: v. Bibra;
Offenbach: Grimm;
Rappenau: Finck; 
Schönberg: R. Hoffmann (Gustav Reinhold Hoffmann, 1831-1919);
Speyer: Keller (Franz Keller), Mühlhaüser (Albert Mühlhaüser);
Stuttgart: v. Fehling, W. Hallwachs; 
Tübingen: Finckh (Karl Finckh, von Winterbach,), A. Naumann, A. Strecker;
Wiesbaden: Kasselmann, R. Fresenius, C. Neubauer;
Würzburg: Scherer, V. Schwarzenbach (Valentin Schwarzenbach, 1830-1890)
 United Kingdom:
Dublin: Apjohn A.;
Edinburgh: Al. Crum Brown, Wanklyn, F. Guthrie;
Glasgow: Anderson;
London: B. F. Duppa (Baldwin Francis Duppa, 1828–1873), G. C. Foster, Gladstone, Müller, Noad, A. Normandy, Odling;
Manchester: Roscoe; 
Oxford: Daubeny, G. Griffeth (G. Griffith), F. Schickendantz;
Woolwich: Abel
 France:
Montpellier: A. Béchamp, A. Gautier, C. G. Reischauer;
Mülhousen i. E.: Th. Schneider;
Nancy: J. Nicklès;
Paris: Boussingault, J-B. Dumas, C. Friedel, L. Grandeau, Le Canu (Louis René Le Canu, 1800–1871), Persoz, Alf. Riche (Jean Baptiste Leopold Alfred Riche, 1829-1908), P. Thénard, Verdét, C.-A. Wurtz;
Strasbourg i. E.: Jacquemin (Eugène Théodore Jacquemin, 1828–1909), Oppermann (Charles Oppermann, 1805-1872), F. Schlagdenhaussen (Frédéric Charles Schlagdenhauffen, 1830–1907), P. Schützenberger;
Tann: Ch. Kestner, Scheurer-Kestner
 Italy:
Genoa: Cannizzaro;
Pavia: Pavesi (Angelo Pavesi)
 Mexico: Posselt (Louis Posselt, 1817-1880, brother of Christian Posselt)
 Austria:
Innsbruck: Hlasiwetz;
Lemberg: Pebal; 
Pesth: Th. Wertheim; 
Vienna: V. v. Lang, A. Lieben, Folwarezny (Carl Folwarezny), F. Schneider
 Portugal: 
Coimbra: Mide Carvalho (Mathias de Carvalho e Vasconcellos, 1832-1910)
Russia:
Kharkov: Sawitsch;
St. Petersburg: Borodin, Mendelyeev, L. Schischkoff, Zinin;
Warsaw: T. Lesinski, Jakub Natanson.
Sweden:
Harpenden: J. H. Gilbert;
Lund: Berlin, C. W. Blomstrand;
Stockholm: Bahr.
Switzerland:
Bern: C. Brunner, H. Schiff;
Geneva: C. Marignac;
Lausanne: Bischoff (Henri Bischoff, 1813–1889)
Reichenau bei Chur: A. v. Planta;
Zurich: J. Wislicenus.
Spain:
Madrid: R. de Luna  .

References

Further reading 
  (subscription required)
 
 
 (Note the incorrect spelling of Weltzien's name.)

 
 (Originally published in 1964.)

 
 
 (Note the incorrect month given for the conference.)

External links 
 When Science Went International, Chemical & Engineering News, Vol. 88, 3.9.2010
 Charles-Adolphe Wurtz's report on the Karlsruhe Congress
 Cannizzaro's 1858 paper
 A History of Chemistry by F. J. Moore (1918) New York: McGraw-Hill

History of chemistry
Academic conferences
Karlsruhe
Chemical nomenclature
Chemistry conferences
1860 in science
1860 in the Grand Duchy of Baden
1860 conferences
Science events in Germany
September 1860 events